The Diocese of the Great Lakes (DGL) is a Continuing Anglican church body in the United States and Canada. Its worship centers and clergy are currently located in the American Great Lakes states and the Canadian Province of Ontario. 

The DGL uses the 1928 American Book of Common Prayer or the 1962 Canadian book, accepts the Holy Scriptures as the inerrant Word of God, adheres to the Thirty-nine Articles of Religion, and ordains only men to the orders of deacon, priest, and bishop. The Thirty-nine Articles are affirmed in their original sense and it is declared that Scripture contains all that is necessary to salvation. The diocese considers itself to be in the evangelical Anglican and broad to low church traditions.  An active work is conducted in nursing homes by DGL clergy and lay readers.

History 

The Anglican Diocese of the Great Lakes was formed in 1998 by the bishops of the Independent Anglican Diocese of Ontario and the Missionary District of the USA, along with priests and deacons formerly belonging to the Independent Anglican Church (Canada Synod). Parishes and missions of the Diocese of the Great Lakes were located in Etobicoke, Niagara Falls, Windsor, Guelph, and Kitchener, Ontario, and in Battle Creek, Michigan.   

In 1998, the DGL was admitted to membership in the Anglican Church, Inc, a federation of Continuing Anglican churches, but withdrew in 2001. Most of the ACI's constituent dioceses reorganized thereafter as the Anglican Church International Communion. 

In 2014, the Diocese of the Great Lakes was admitted to the United Episcopal Church of North America as its diocese for the Upper Midwest and Eastern Canada.

Leadership 

The Bishop Ordinary of the Diocese of the Great Lakes is David Thomas Hustwick, Rector of Saints Andrew and Matthias Anglican Church in Hastings, Michigan. The Bishop Suffragan is John M. Pafford of Midland, Michigan.

External links
Diocese of the Great Lakes website

Christian organizations established in 1998
Anglican denominations in North America
Continuing Anglican denominations
Evangelical Anglicanism